The USSR State Jazz Band (or The State Jazz Orchestra of the USSR) was a Soviet jazz band that existed in 1930s–1940s.

After it was auditioned by Joseph Stalin in 1938, a number of similar state-sponsored musical ensembles were created across the country.

Critical analysis 
S. Frederick Starr comments in his book on the Soviet jazz that the band "played with a polish and precision any Western pop orchestra might have envied". But then he adds:

Boris Schwarz's book Music and Musical Life in Soviet Russia, 1917–1970 describes The State Jazz Orchestra of the USSR as "essentially" a "'light' music" (easy listening) orchestra.

Selected discography 
 "Katyusha" (1939)

References

External links 
 

Soviet jazz bands
Musical groups established in 1938
1938 establishments in the Soviet Union